The International Union of Socialist Youth (IUSY) is an international organization, founded in 1907, whose activities include publications, support of member organizations and the organization of meetings. It was formed as the youth wing of the Second International under the name Socialist Youth International at the International Socialist Congress, Stuttgart 1907.

IUSY now has 145 member organisations - including 122 full members and 23 observer members - from 106 countries. IUSY gained status as an international youth NGO with UN ECOSOC consultative status in 1993.

History 
On 24–27 August 1907, a meeting of 20 youth representatives from 13 countries met in the German city of Stuttgart and founded the Socialist Youth International as the youth organization of the Second International. Its international office was located in Vienna and it has remained there to this day except for a few brief extraordinary periods.

It held parallel congresses in 1910 and 1912 following the International Socialist Congress, Copenhagen 1910 and International Socialist Congress, Basle 1912. Preparations were made for a further one in 1914 but it was cancelled, as with the other planned socialist congresses.

The socialist youth organizations, just like their mother parties, were confronted by the growing influence of nationalism and militarism in Europe. When the First World War broke out in 1914, even though the vast majority of the socialist parties openly supported their country's war efforts, the Socialist Youth International remained steadfast in their principled opposition to war and militarism. The organization had to move its offices to Zurich and from there it published its journal, Youth International, calling for peace, which had to be distributed illegally given the circumstances. The struggle for peace subsequently became a hallmark of the socialist youth organization.

The formation of the Communist International in Moscow in 1919 officially split the worker's and youth movement into two sides. The representatives of the socialist and social-democratic current reconvened the International Socialist Youth Movement in 1921.

In 1925, in the wake of the fascist takeover of Italy, the youth organization from the country was forced to stop participating in the work of the ISYM. This marked the beginning of the organization's fight against fascism. In 1933, the Berlin office was evacuated to Prague.

After the Second World War, on 30 September 1946, at the congress in Paris the organization formally became known as the International Union of Socialist Youth. It began to accept a growing number of youth organizations from outside of Europe and by the beginning of the 1950s IUSY included 73 member organizations from 50 countries. Since that time, the organization has more than doubled.

Following the Paris congress and up through the 1960s, IUSY focused on supporting decolonisation efforts and struggles for independence, especially in Africa and Asia. In the 1970s, the organization was active in drawing attention to the human rights violations by military governments in South America and building up international solidarity campaigns, especially against Pinochet in Chile and Somoza in Nicaragua.

IUSY was cautiously supportive of the democratization process in Eastern Europe because the organization wanted these changes to benefit the general population, not just a tiny elite. Although the nuclear arms race ended with the fall of the Berlin Wall, the transition from authoritarian regimes has brought about new conflicts in these regions. Human trafficking and refugees, resulting from civil conflicts, became the new focus of efforts on the part of IUSY. IUSY formed the Balkan Roundtable and Black Sea Area Committees to facilitate dialogue and cooperation among the different countries.

Looking towards the future, there remains much work to be done. IUSY is committed to working with the member youth organizations to develop effective tools for the treatment and prevention of the HIV-AIDS pandemic. The advancement of individual human rights and liberties in many places is a special concern. The recent events have highlighted the basic economic inequality that exists throughout the world and drawn attention to the struggle for social justice and equality.

Activities 

IUSY's main field of activity is in the promotion of democracy, human rights, and youth policy. IUSY works by engaging international institutions, such as the Council of Europe, United Nations, Socialist International, European Youth Forum, and others, and directly targeting policy makers and media representatives at an international level to advocate for equal opportunities and the right to social and political participation for youth all over the world. Furthermore, IUSY trains activists at the grassroots level in the international political debate and policy development by organizing conferences and supporting political campaigns and initiatives on a regional and global level.

IUSY works to strengthen its member organizations by providing a broad network of support and facilitating educational workshops and training seminars, aimed at increasing their capacity to fight for political change in their respective countries.

The IUSY Congress is the highest decision-making body within the organization. It elects the President, the Secretary General, the Presidium and the Control Commission. The IUSY Congress and IUSY Council take place every second year on an alternating basis. The IUSY coordinates its activities on two levels – regional and global.

The global Presidium is composed of the President, the Secretary General and 19 Vice-Presidents, who meet regularly to discuss and develop policy.

The IUSY has five regional committees – American, African, Asian-Pacific, European, and Mediterranean – that meet annually. Also, IUSY has two permanent working groups – Feminism and LGBT – that deal with issues involving those specific themes.

The IUSY Secretariat, led by the Secretary General, organizes all activities and is responsible for finances, communication, and the daily work of the organization. IUSY's working languages are English, French, and Spanish.

The IUSY World Festival brings together activists and is organized approximately every two or three years.

Presidium and Control Commission

Presidium 
IUSY is led by its Presidium, elected every two years at the Congress, with representatives from all over the world. The current members (2021–2023) are listed below:

President:
  Jesus Tapia, JMAS, (Venezuela)

Secretary general:
  Bruno Gonçalves, (Juventude Socialista, Portugal)

Vice-presidents:
  Darak Abdelfattah, UJSARIO, Western Sahara
  Khulekani Mondli, ANCYL NYTT, South Africa
  Amed Tiendrebeogo, UNJ-MPP, Burkina Faso
  Jeunesse RPM, Mali
  Avril Reyes Rodriguez, JRM Dominican Republic
  Agustina Rodriguez, JS, Argentina
  Bernando Meneses, JPRD, Panama
  Ricardo Lillo, JS, Chile
  Basilio Enrique Claudio, AY, Philippines
  Samantha Carin Wood, Young Labour, New Zealand
  Ana Manasieva, SDYM, North Macedonia
  Tajma Sisic, SSU Sweden
  Sarineh Abrahamian, AYF, Armenia
  Victoria Hiepe, JUSOS, Germany
  Julius Jandl, VSSTO, Austria
  Harun Muharemovic, DSU, Denmark
  Vittorio Pecoraro, GD, Italy
  Saif Aqel, FYM, Palestine

Control Commission

Associate Members 
 Young European Socialists (YES)

Historical leadership

Presidents 

1946 Bob Molenaar (Netherlands)
1948 Peter Strasser (Austria)
1954 Nath Pai (India)
1960 Kyi Nyunt (Burma)
1966 Wilbert Perera (Ceylon)
1969 Luis A. Carello (Argentina)
1971 Raphael Albuquerque (Dominican Republic)
1973 Luis Ayala (Chile)
1975 Jerry Svensson (Sweden)
1977 Alejandro Montesino (Chile)
1979 Hilary Barnard (UK)
1981 Milton Colindres (El Salvador)
1983 Kirsten Jensen (Denmark)
1985 Joan Calabuig (Spain)
1989 Sven Eric Söder (Sweden)
1991 Roger Hällhag (Sweden)
1995 Nicola Zingaretti (Italy)
1997 Umberto Gentiloni (Italy)
1999 Alvaro Elizalde (Chile)
2004 Fikile Mbalula (South Africa)
2008 Jacinda Ardern (New Zealand)
2010 Viviana Piñeiro (Uruguay)
2014 Felipe Jeldres (Chile)
2016 Howard Lee Chuan How (Malaysia)
2018 Johanna Ortega (Paraguay)
2021 Jesus Tapia (Venezuela)

Secretary Generals 

1946 Per Hækkerup (Denmark)
1954 Kurt Kristiansson (Sweden)
1960 Per Aasen (Norway)
1963 Sture Ericson (Sweden)
1966 Jan Hækkerup (Denmark)
1970 Bernt Carlsson (Sweden)
1971 Jerry Svensson (Sweden)
1973 Johan Peanberg (Sweden)
1975 Friedrich O.J. Roll (Germany)
1977 Owe Fich (Denmark)
1979 Jukka Oas (Finland)
1981 Bengt Ohlsson (Sweden)
1983 Robert Kredig (Germany)
1985 Dirk Drijbooms (Belgium)
1989 Ricard Torrell (Spain)
1993 Alfredo Remo Lazzeretti (Argentina)
1997 Lisa Pelling (Sweden)
2001 Enzo Amendola (Italy)
2006 Yvonne O'Callaghan (Ireland)
2009 Johan Hassel (Sweden)
2012 Beatriz Talegón (Spain)
2014 Evin Incir (Sweden)
2016 Alessandro Pirisi (Italy)
2018 Ana Pirtskhalava (Georgia)
2021 Bruno Gonçalves (Portugal)

Control Commission Presidents 

1998 Tim Scholz (Socialist Youth of Germany – Falcons, Germany)
2002 Marten Jennerjahn (Socialist Youth of Germany – Falcons, Germany)
2004 Sven Frye (Socialist Youth of Germany – Falcons, Germany)
2010 Svenja Matusall (Socialist Youth of Germany – Falcons, Germany)
2012 Michael Dehmlow (Socialist Youth of Germany – Falcons, Germany)
2014 Stephan Köker (Socialist Youth of Germany – Falcons, Germany)
2016 Roland Gúr (Societas – Left-Wing Youth Movement, Hungary)
2021 Hend Mgaieth (JSD Tunisia, Tunisia)

Congresses 

1946 Paris (France)
1948 Leuven (Belgium)
1951 Hamburg (Germany)
1954 Copenhagen (Denmark)
1957 Rome (Italy)
1960 Vienna (Austria)
1963 Oslo (Norway)
1966 Oslo (Norway)
1969 Rome (Italy)
1971 London (extraordinary) (UK)
1973 Malta (Malta)
1975 Brussels (Belgium)
1977 Stuttgart (Germany)
1979 Frankfurt (Germany)
1981 Vienna (Austria)
1983 Jørlunde (Denmark)
1985 Sevilla (Spain)
1987 Brussels (Belgium)
1989 Bommersvik (Sweden)
1991 Seč (Czechoslovakia)
1993 Montevideo (Uruguay)
1995 Modena (Italy)
1997 Lillehammer (Norway)
1999 Hamburg (Germany)
2001 Johannesburg (South Africa)
2004 Budapest (Hungary)
2006 Esbjerg (Denmark)
2008 Santo Domingo (Dominican Republic)
2010 Bommersvik (Sweden)
2012 Asuncion (Paraguay)
2014 Copenhagen (Denmark)
2016 Tirana (Albania)
2018 Budva (Montenegro)
2021 Panama City (Panama)

International camps and festivals 
IUSY has held international "camps" and "festivals" since 1952, at various locations around the world.

1952 IUSY Camp Vienna (Austria)
1954 IUSY Camp Liège (Belgium)
1956 IUSY Camp Tampere (Finland)
1959 IUSY Camp Berlin (Germany)
1962 IUSY Camp Copenhagen (Denmark)
1965 IUSY Camp Carmel (Israel)
1968 IUSY Camp Vierhouten (Netherlands)
1974 IUSY Camp Attersee (Austria)
1977 Internationales Sozialistisches Jugendtreffen Stuttgart (Germany)
1981 Internationales Sozialistisches Jugendtreffen Vienna (Austria)
1985 IUSY Festival Luxembourg (Luxembourg)
1987 IUSY Festival Valencia (Spain)
1992 IUSY Festival Porto (Portugal)
1996 IUSY Festival Bonn (Germany)
2000 IUSY Festival Malmö (Sweden)
2003 IUSY Festival Kamena Vourla (Greece)
2006 IUSY Festival Alicante (Spain)
2007 IUSY 100 Celebration Berlin (Germany)
2009 IUSY Festival Zánka (Hungary)
2011 IUSY Festival Attersee (Austria)
2014 IUSY Festival (Malta)
2017 IUSY Festival Jale (Albania)

Partner organisations 

 Advisory Council on Youth in the Council of Europe
 European Youth Forum (YFJ)
 Global Progressive Forum (GPF)
 Global Progressive Youth Forum (GPYF)
 Iberoamerican Youth Organisation
 International Coordination Meeting of Youth Organisations (ICMYO)
 International Falcon Movement - Socialist Educational International (IFM-SEI)
 Pan African Youth Union (PYU)
 Socialist International (SI)
 Socialist International Women (SIW)
 SOLIDAR
 Young European Socialists (YES)
 Party of European Socialists (PES)

See also 

 List of International Union of Socialist Youth member organisations

References

Bibliography

External links 

 Official website
 Archives of Sozialistische Jugend-Internationale (former German name) at the International Institute of Social History

International organisations based in Vienna
Socialist Youth, International Union of
Youth wings of social democratic parties
Socialist International
Progressive Alliance
Second International
1907 establishments in Germany
Youth organizations established in the 1900s
International Socialist Organisations
International Campaign to Abolish Nuclear Weapons